Jefferson School was an elementary school building located at Cape Girardeau, Missouri.  It was built in 1904, and is a two-story, red brick and stone elementary school building with a raised sandstone foundation and hipped roof. It featured a bell tower rising above the roofline. It operated as the city's elementary school for African-American students from 1953–1955, when it closed. It was demolished on December 28, 2012.

It was listed on the National Register of Historic Places in 2009.

References

African-American history of Missouri
School buildings on the National Register of Historic Places in Missouri
School buildings completed in 1904
Schools in Cape Girardeau County, Missouri
National Register of Historic Places in Cape Girardeau County, Missouri
1904 establishments in Missouri